The 1973 Northern Iowa Panthers football team represented the University of Northern Iowa as a member of the North Central Conference (NCC) during the 1973 NCAA Division II football season. Led by 14th-year head coach Stan Sheriff, the Panthers compiled an overall record of 5–5 with a mark of 2–5 in conference play, placing seventh in the NCC. Northern Iowa played home games at O. R. Latham Stadium in Cedar Falls, Iowa.

Schedule

References

Northern Iowa
Northern Iowa Panthers football seasons
Northern Iowa Panthers football